Poinguinim is a village in the Canacona taluka administrative region of Goa, India, near the Goa-Karnataka border, and close to the Cotigao Wildlife Sanctuary. The village is home to a population of 6,625 people as of the 2011 census.

The name of the village derives from poi, a strip of low-lying land along a river or sea, or a narrow inlet that floods in high tide, and guim or guine, meaning low-lying area.

See also
Majali
Sadishivgarh
Karwar
Ankola

References

Cities and towns in South Goa district